Brigadier Kenneth Hargreaves (23 February 1903 – 27 March 1990) was a British soldier and industrialist who held several local offices in Yorkshire.

He was commissioned into the Leeds Rifles, a Territorial Army battalion of the West Yorkshire Regiment, in 1922 but later transferred to the Royal Artillery when the Leeds Rifles became 66th Anti-Aircraft Regiment, RA. He was appointed Commander of the Order of the British Empire (CBE) in 1956.

He married Else Markenstam (d. 1968) in 1958, and adopted his stepchildren by that marriage, Ingrid Mary and Peter Hargreaves-Allen. He subsequently married Hon. Margaret Lane-Fox, the daughter of George Lane-Fox, 1st Baron Bingley, on 15 February 1969.

Hargreaves served as High Sheriff of Yorkshire in 1962, Lord Lieutenant of the West Riding of Yorkshire from 1970 until 1974, when, as a result of the reorganization of county governments, he became Lord Lieutenant of West Yorkshire until 1978. He was appointed a Deputy Lieutenant of West Yorkshire on 4 May 1978.

References

External links
Generals of World War II

1903 births
1990 deaths
West Yorkshire Regiment officers
Royal Artillery officers
Commanders of the Order of the British Empire
Knights of the Order of St John
Lord-Lieutenants of the West Riding of Yorkshire
Lord-Lieutenants of West Yorkshire
High Sheriffs of Yorkshire
British Army brigadiers of World War II